The Youghiogheny River Lake is a flood control reservoir in southwestern Pennsylvania and western Maryland. The lake is a significant tourist attraction, bringing over one million visitors a year to the area.

The lake was formed in 1944 by the damming of the Youghiogheny River upstream from Confluence, Pennsylvania. The dam facilitates flood control, improves river flow and provides 12 megawatts of hydroelectric power. U.S. Route 40 crosses the lake between Jockey Hollow on the Fayette County side and Somerfield on the Somerset County side.

Somerfield was laid out on the western edge of Addison Township, Somerset County, about 1816 by Philip D. Smyth, who originally named the settlement Smythfield. Somerfield was abandoned, razed, and inundated when the reservoir was filled in the 1940s. The stone Great Crossings Bridge of the National Road, which crossed the Youghiogheny at Somerfield, is visible at extremely low water levels. The triple-arch sandstone bridge was constructed between 1815 and 1818 by James Kinkead, James Beck, and Evan Evans.

References

Protected areas of Garrett County, Maryland
Reservoirs in Maryland
Reservoirs in Pennsylvania
United States Army Corps of Engineers, Pittsburgh District
Protected areas of Fayette County, Pennsylvania
Protected areas of Somerset County, Pennsylvania
Bodies of water in Fayette County, Pennsylvania
Bodies of water of Somerset County, Pennsylvania
Bodies of water of Garrett County, Maryland